The Nome Arctic Railway was the name of the reorganized Wild Goose Railroad. The Railway was created in 1903, and ran for a four-month period from 1903 to 1905. In 1906 the railroad was bought out by the newly formed Seward Peninsula Railway.

References

Defunct Alaska railroads
1903 establishments in Alaska
1906 disestablishments in Alaska